Mora is an unincorporated community in Natchitoches Parish, Louisiana, United States. Its ZIP code is 71455.

Notes

Unincorporated communities in Natchitoches Parish, Louisiana
Unincorporated communities in Louisiana
Populated places in Ark-La-Tex